Rock Island is the second studio album by American band Palm. It was released in February 2018 under Carpark Records.

Track listing

References

2018 albums
Carpark Records albums